Tan Yu (5 April 1927 – 12 March 2002) was a Chinese-Filipino philanthropist and businessman who founded the Asiaworld Internationale Group and established the KTTI Foundation, which provided scholarships to and supported the education of thousands of young students. In 1997, Forbes listed Tan Yu as the 7th wealthiest person in the world, estimating his net worth to be about $7 billion. He was placed amongst the top 10 in the world on the Forbes List of World Billionaires 1997, making him wealthiest man in the Philippines.

Early life
Originally from Fujian province in China, Yu and his family moved to the Philippines at a young age. He began making a living in the province of Camarines Norte through selling bread buns in the streets and doing some fishing. He graduated from University of St. La Salle in Bacolod, and in 1997, received an honorary doctorate of science degree from the New Jersey Institute of Technology. By the age of 18, he had established a successful textile business.

Business Interests
During his lifetime, he planned to develop his private islands Fuga and Barit, two of the northernmost islands in the Philippines, into a resort in the Pacific for businessmen and tourists. Under the company Asiaworld, he possessed more land in the Philippines than the government, as well as possessing overseas assets in the form of property, hotels and banks.

His key holdings included the Asiaworld Plaza Hotel in Taiwan, over 200 Hectares of prime land in Manila Bay and the Islands of Fuga and Barit.

Personal life and death
Tan Yu died of heart failure in Houston, Texas, in 2002 at the age of 74. Jose de Venecia, the Speaker of the House of Representatives in the Philippines, commended his achievements as a great businessman and as a philanthropist, for providing jobs to a number of Philippine people. He was posthumously honored with the Dr. Jose P. Rizal Award for Excellence.

His children continue to live in the Philippines, Taiwan, Hong Kong and the US.

In the Story Arc 2078 edition of the Philippines comic strip series Pugad Baboy, Ninoy Aquino International Airport was named as Tan Yu International Airport (TYIA).

References

1927 births
2002 deaths
Businesspeople in agriculture
Filipino businesspeople in real estate
Filipino billionaires
Filipino philanthropists
Chinese emigrants to the Philippines
Naturalized citizens of the Philippines
Businesspeople from Fujian
University of St. La Salle alumni
New Jersey Institute of Technology alumni
People from Jinjiang, Fujian
20th-century philanthropists